Hanns-Herbert Schulz (26 June 1927 – 9 June 2006), better known as Hanns Petersen, was a German opera singer (baritone), music college teacher and pop singer. He is known for his career in popular music (Schlager), his many operatic performances at the Semperoper and the Deutsches Nationaltheater Weimar and his work as a professor at the Hochschule für Musik Carl Maria von Weber and Hochschule für Musik Franz Liszt, Weimar.

Career

Studies and first performances 
Hanns-Herbert Schulz, the son of Ella Schulz-Schulenburg and Walter Schulz, solo cellist at the German National Theater Weimar and professor at the Leipzig University of Music and director of the Hochschule für Musik Franz Liszt, Weimar, studied the violoncello as a guest student from 1942 to 1944. Thereafter, he studied singing under Hauschild and opera production with Kranz at the Hochschule für Musik Franz Liszt, Weimar from 1945 to 50. After graduating, he began both his career as a soloist and as an opera singer at the  German National Theater Weimar under his real name Hanns-Herbert Schulz and his career as a singer in light entertainment music under the pseudonym Hanns Petersen.

'Schlager' singer Hanns Petersen 
Hanns Petersen's career began as a singer with the Leipzig Radio Dance Orchestra (Rundfunk-Tanzorchester Leipzig) conducted by Kurt Henkels. Petersen became known through his numerous radio productions, television broadcasts, Amiga recordings and public events. However, first recordings were made on Weimar's provincial radio (Landessender Weimar) as early as 1946. In June 1951 he also took part in the '3. Tag des Rundfunks''' as a singer in the Kurt Henkels Orchestra. In the same year he published the popular song Am Samstag Um Vier (On Saturday At Four) with singer Sonja Siewert. Petersen also sang several duets and love songs with the German pop singer Irma Baltuttis. 1959 he ended his career in the Schlager genre.

 Opera singer Hanns-Herbert Schulz 
After finishing his studies, Hanns-Herbert Schulz sang at the Deutsches Nationaltheater Weimar from 1952 to 1959 and at the Staatsoper Dresden (Semperoper) from 1959 to 1962, as well as from 1965 to 1969. He became a widely acclaimed opera singer through his performances as Nabucco, Don Giovanni, Kaspar (Der Freischütz) and Eugen Onegin et al. In the meantime (from 1962 to 1965) he was also working as an opera singer at the Opernhaus Leipzig.

 Dresdner Staatsoper (selection) 

 1958 – 1966: Amonasro in Giuseppe Verdi: "Aida" – Staged by Erich Geiger 1959 – 1965: King in Carl Orff: „Die Kluge“ – Staged by Erhard Fischer 1962 – 1966: Count in Wolfgang Amadeus Mozart: „Die Hochzeit des Figaro“ – Inszenierung von Erich Geiger 1963 – 1969: Guglielmo in W. A. Mozart: Così fan tutte – Staged by Erich Geiger 1964 – 1966: Don Giovanni in W. A. Mozart: „Don Giovanni“ – Staged by Erich Geiger 1960 – 1962: Schischkoff in Leoš Janáček: „Aus einem Totenhaus“ – Staged by Erich Geiger 1960 – 1968: Narrator in W. A. Mozart: „Die Zauberflöte“ (The Magic Flute) – Staged by Erhard Fischer 1962 – 1963, 1967: Konrad Nightingale in Richard Wagner: „Die Meistersinger von Nürnberg“ – Staged by Heinz Arnold 1960 – 1965: Scarpia in Giacomo Puccini: „Tosca“ – Staged by Erich Geiger
 1964: Kaspar in Carl Maria von Weber: „Der Freischütz“ – Staged by Johannes Wieke 1959 – 1964: Escamillo in Georges Bizet: „Carmen“ – Staged by Erich Geiger 1964 – 1968: Count in Richard Strauss' Capriccio – Staged by Erich Witte

Berliner Staatsoper (selection of roles) 

 1956: Worker Gil in Rudolf Wagner-Régeny: „Der Günstling“ (The Favourite)
 1962: Scarpia in Giacomo Puccini: „Tosca“
 1967: Count in Wolfgang Amadeus Mozart: „Die Hochzeit des Figaro“

Deutsches Nationaltheater Weimar (selection of roles) 

 Hans Foltz / and also Kothner in Richard Wagner: „Die Meistersinger von Nürnberg“
 King Heinrich in Richard Wagner: „Lohengrin“
 Count / and also Wolfram von Eschenbach in Richard Wagner: „Tannhäuser“
 Fafner in Richard Wagner: „Siegfried“
 Hunding in Richard Wagner: „Die Walküre“
 Fasolt in Richard Wagner: „Das Rheingold“
 Hagen in Richard Wagner: „Götterdämmerung“
 Amfortas in Richard Wagner: „Parsifal“
 Doctor Grenvil in Giuseppe Verdi: „La traviata“

Opera House Leipzig (selection of roles) 

 Wolfram von Eschenbach in Richard Wagner: „Tannhäuser“
 Prince Igor in Prince Igor - produced by Joachim Herz (1959)

University teaching position

Hochschule für Musik Carl Maria von Weber 
In 1970 he was instrumental in setting up the popular music departments at the music academies in Dresden and Weimar, where he began teaching singing. In 1986 he received his professorship in Dresden. Many well-known German singers, such as Veronica Fischer, Reinhard Fißler, Heinz-Jürgen Gottschalk, Ike Moriz, Ute Freudenberg, Brigitte Stefan and Tom Luca studied singing under Schulz. He taught here for a total of over thirty years until shortly before his death in 2006.

Hochschule für Musik Franz Liszt Weimar 
Schulz taught from 1968 as a lecturer, from 1970 as a singing teacher and from 1983 to 1992 as professor for singing in the dance and popular music department at the Hochschule für Musik Franz Liszt, Weimar. He remained connected to the university as a lecturer until 1994.

Discography

Song titles (selection) 
All published by Amiga (record label):

 Addio amore (Arden, Harper, Pelosi)
 Addio Donna Gracia – 1951 (Friedrich Wilhelm Rust)
 Adelheid – 1951 (Willy Berking, Willi Tom Stassar)
 Am Samstag um vier (mit Sonja Siewert) – 1951 (Hans-Joachim Schulze, Bully Buhlan)
 Andalusische Märchen – 1953 (Erwin Halletz, André Hoff)
 Cordoba (Rudi Bohn, Helmuth Schattel)
 Denk´ an mich -1953 (Gerhard Honig, Willi Mok)
 Dolores – 1951 (Michael Jary, Bruno Balz)
 Dreh dich noch einmal um – 1953 (Heino Gaze, Bruno Balz)
 Du hast so wunderschöne blaue Augen – 1953 (Willy Berking, Heinz Woezel)
 Ein Musikus, ein Musikus (Heino Gaze)
 Geflüster – 1953 (John Schonberger)
 Hernando's Hideaway – 1956 (Jerry Ross, Richard Adler)
 Ich build´ mir ein – 1954 (TV-Produktion)
 Ich habe heut´ nacht eine große Dummheit gemacht – 1953 (Rudolf Burkhardt, Carl-Ulrich Blecher)
 Ich lad´ dich ein, Cherie – 1954 (J. Marsala, Heino Gaze)
 Ich möcht´ mit dir spazieren geh´n (Günter Oppenheimer, Helmut Kießling)
 Jambalaya – 1953 (Hank Williams, Kurt Feltz)
 Jawoll, das ist Musik – 1953 (Alfred Jack, Carl-Ulrich Blecher)
 Je vous aime (Benny de Weille, Werner Loeper)
 Kleiner Bär von Berlin (Botho Lucas, H. Hinze Kriegler)
 Lass die Sorgen Sorgen sein (E. Buder, H. Hemes)
 Leg´ deine Hand in meine Hand (mit Irma Baltuttis) -1953 (Burger, S. Schmidt)
 Leise weht der Wind – 1953 (Siegfried Mai, Johannes Kretzschmar)
 Madeleine – 1954 (TV-Produktion)
 Noch vor Tag (E. P. Hoyer, Arnold Bormann)
 O, Pepita – 1952 (Harry Frank, Alfredo Zmigrod)
 Reiterlied – 1951 (Sfasmann, Hans-Georg Herde, M.Koch)
 Schütt die Sorgen in ein Gläschen Wein – 1953 (Gerhard Winkler, Erich Meder)
 Seemannsgarn – 1953 (Walter Eichenberg, Johannes Kretzschmar)
 Singe, Wind – 1952 (Isaac Dunajewskij, Lebedew-Kumatsch)
 Spatz und Spätzin (mit Irma Baltuttis) – 1953 (Helmut Nier)
 Süße kleine Dorothee (Gerhard Honig, Mok)
 Tamingo – 1956 (Ernst Peter Hoyer, Arnold Bormann)
 Verlieb´ dich nicht am Nordpol – 1950 (Michael Jary, Bruno Balz)
 Wenn du wüsstest, ach, wie ich dich liebe (mit Irma Baltuttis) – 1951 (Rolf Zimmermann, Günter Klein)
 Wir sind füreinander bestimmt (mit Irma Baltuttis) – 1951 (Gerhard Winkler, Hase)

Literature 

 Bernd Meyer-Rähnitz, Frank Oehme, Joachim Schütte: Die "Ewige Freundin" – Eterna und Amiga; Die Discographie der Schellackplatten (1947–1961). Albis International Bibliophilen-Verlag, Dresden/Ústí 2006, 
 Siegfried Trzoß: Schlager-Geschichte(n) des Ostens. Band 1 bis 3. Aperçu-Verlag, Berlin, 
 R. Sudmann: Popmusik in Studiengängen deutscher Hochschulen. In: Handbuch Jugend und Musik / Dieter Baacke (Hrsg.), Opladen (Leske und Budrich), 
 Eike Moriz: Darstellung verschiedener stimmbildnerischer Arbeitsmethoden und deren vergleichende Betrachtung. Blurb Bücher Deutschland, 2020, 
 Werner P. Seiferth: Richard Wagner in der DDR – Versuch einer Bilanz. Sax Verlag, 2012, 
 D. J. Aitken, International Handbook of Universities 1981, Eighth Edition, Walter de Gruyter GmbH & Co KG, 18 May 2020, page 414
 Musikstudium, Musikpraxis : Beitr. zu Theorie u. Praxis d. Erziehung u. Ausbildung von Musikern u. Musikpädagogen in d. DDR / hrsg. von Hans John u. Günther Stephan, Hanns-Herbert Schulz, Zur Hochschulausbildung von Gesangssolisten der Tanz- und Unterhaltungsmusik, page 299,

References

External links 

 Hanns Petersen at MusicBrainz
 Hanns Petersen at Discogs
 DDR Tanzmusik - biography of Hanns Petersen / Hans-Herbert Schulz
 Hanns Petersen - music collectors

20th-century German male opera singers
Vocal coaches
Hochschule für Musik Carl Maria von Weber
Hochschule für Musik Franz Liszt, Weimar
Academic staff of the Hochschule für Musik Franz Liszt, Weimar
2006 deaths
German jazz singers
Academic staff of the Hochschule für Musik Carl Maria von Weber
1927 births